George Mason I (5 June 1629 – 1686) was the American progenitor of the prominent American landholding and political Mason family. Mason was the great-grandfather of George Mason IV, a Founding Father of the United States.

Early life
George Mason was born in Pershore, England, on 5 June 1629. He was the third of seven children of yeoman farmer Thomas Mason and his wife Ann French. George Mason was christened at Pershore Abbey, Holy Cross Church, Pershore, Worcestershire, on 10 June 1629.

Political involvement in England
George Mason I was a Cavalier during the reign of Charles I of England, like his father Thomas Mason, who opposed Charles I's execution in 1649. He became a captain, commanding a troop of horse in Charles II's army. After Oliver Cromwell led the parliamentary-funded troops to victory over the Masons and other Royalist forces at the Battle of Worcester in 1651, George and younger brother William Mason hurriedly left England.

Arrival in Virginia and political and military leadership
The ancestral Masons probably arrived at Norfolk, Virginia on the ship Assurance in 1652. In addition to his younger brother William, he emigrated with cousins and neighbors from England, Thomas and Gerard Fowke of Staffordshire. Mason settled in then-vast Westmoreland County in the early 1650s. In 1664 he helped to name Stafford County when increasing population in the area led the Virginia General Assembly and royal governor to form it from Westmoreland County. 

This first George Mason eventually settled permanently near an Indian village along Accokeek Creek on a hill between present-day State Routes 608 (Brooke Road) and 621 (Marlborough Point Road) in Stafford County. 
Mason named his residence Accokeek, but after the tribe disappeared from the area, the Mason family rechristened it "Rose Hill". The property was named for the Accokeek tribe which inhabited both sides of the Potomac River (and despite later wars and disease some individuals remained in present-day Prince George's County, Maryland through the Revolutionary War area).

In 1670, Mason won election as Stafford county's (second) sheriff and five years later won election to the important military position as county lieutenant. Mason continued to lead the local militia as an officer, earning the honorific colonel.

In 1676, after their former delegate Henry Meese (1665-1669) returned to England, fellow settlers elected Mason and Thomas Matthew to represent Stafford county (part time) in the Virginia General Assembly (which at first consisted only of the House of Burgesses). However, the following year, neither won re-election, and Stafford county was represented by only William Fitzhugh for several years. In 1680, the House of Burgesses was expanded, and voters elected Mason to serve alongside Fitzhugh, though he would die in 1686 and his son would win election and re-election many times (including alongside Fitzhurh and his son). The first George Mason in Virginia thus began traditions of land ownership (including of indentured servants and later enslaved people) and of political leadership. 

Mason also served as Stafford County's as a Justice of the Peace and vestryman of the local parish of the Church of England. The Acts of the Assembly for 1675, 1679, and 1684, mention Colonel Mason as actively engaged in defending his frontier county against the Indians.

Marriage and children
Mason married Mary French in 1658. He and Mary had one son:

George Mason II (1660–1716)

Mason married secondly to Margaret Allerton in Stafford County, Virginia in 1661. They had 3 sons:
 Isaac Mason (1661-1689)
 Richard Mason (1662-1693)
 William Mason (1663-1686)
Mason married thirdly to Frances Norgrave in 1669 in Stafford County, Virginia. They had one daughter, Sarah E. Mason, born in 1672.

Later life
Mason died in 1686. His body was interred in 1686 on a hillside at Accokeek in Stafford County, Virginia. His gravesite is currently unmarked.

Masonvale
George Mason University, named in honor of Mason's great-grandson, re-established its Naming Committee to research and select names for its campus facilities and infrastructure. The committee agreed upon the name "Masonvale" for its faculty and staff housing community in the northeast section of George Mason University's Fairfax Campus. The appendage of "vale" was derived from George Mason I's birthplace, Pershore, which lies in an agricultural region known as the Vale of Evesham in Worcestershire, England. To unify the naming theme within Masonvale, the names "Pershore" and "Evesham" were then used as street names for the community. Other street names used are "Bredon Hill," "Cotswolds Hill," and "Staffordshire." All are regions of Old Worcestershire where many of Mason's ancestors once resided.

References

1629 births
1686 deaths
American planters
American slave owners
British North American Anglicans
Cavaliers
House of Burgesses members
Mason family
People from Pershore
People from Stafford County, Virginia
Virginia sheriffs
English emigrants